The 1978 Glasgow Garscadden by-election was a parliamentary by-election held on 13 April 1978 for the British House of Commons constituency of Glasgow Garscadden, in the north west periphery of the City of Glasgow.

It was won by Donald Dewar of the Labour Party.  It was important in that it was widely seen as halting the Scottish National Party (SNP) tide in the 1970s.

Previous Member of Parliament 
The by-election was caused by the death of William Watson Small (19 October 1909 – 18 January 1978) who was a Labour Party politician from Scotland.

Small was an engineer. He was an Ayrshire County Councillor from 1945 to 1951 and an active member of the Amalgamated Engineering Union, serving on its national committee from 1955 to 1957 and as president of the union's West Ayrshire district.

At the 1959 general election, he was elected as Member of Parliament for Glasgow Scotstoun.  At the February 1974 election he was elected for Glasgow Garscadden which was largely the same constituency under a new name.  He held that seat until his death.

Small never held ministerial office, but served as Parliamentary Private Secretary to the Minister of Power from 1964.

Candidates 
Six candidates were nominated for the by-election.

The Labour candidate was Donald Campbell Dewar.  He had worked as a solicitor in Glasgow before being elected at the age of 28 in the 1966 general election to Westminster to represent the marginal constituency of Aberdeen South. In his maiden speech in the Commons Dewar railed against a proposed increase on potato tax. This was his first notable success - the tax was repealed in 1967. That year he was made Parliamentary Private Secretary to the Education Secretary Anthony Crosland, who Dewar later confessed to never really establishing a rapport with. He held that position until 1969. In April 1968 he was proposed for a Minister of State position by Roy Jenkins but nothing came of it.  He lost his seat to Iain Sproat at the 1970 general election.

Dewar later went on to become Secretary of State for Scotland, and the first First Minister of Scotland.

Representing the Scottish National Party (SNP) was Keith S. Bovey. He had previously contested the neighbouring seat of Glasgow Hillhead in February 1974 and Garscadden in the October 1974 general election. In that contest the SNP replaced the Conservative Party as the runners up to Labour in Glasgow Garscadden.  He was also a senior figure in CND.

Bovey went on to contest Glasgow Hillhead in 1983, as well as Monklands West in the 1987 and 1992 general elections.

The Conservative nominee was Iain M. Lawson. He contested Dumbarton for the Conservatives in 1983. Later he was the SNP candidate for Stirling in 1987 and for Paisley South in the 1990 Paisley South by-election and the 1992 general election.

Mrs Shiona Farrell represented the Scottish Labour Party, which was a short lived breakaway party from the Labour Party. She did not contest any other parliamentary election.

Sammy Barr was the Communist candidate. He contested Glasgow Garscadden in February 1974, 1979 and 1983, as well as at this by-election.

The Socialist Workers Party stood Peter Porteous, who did not contest any other parliamentary election.

Votes 

 Death of William Small 18 January 1978

Political context
The by-election was important as it was the first Westminster by-election in Scotland to take place since the October 1974 general election, a lengthy gap.  The SNP was widely seen as being on a rise, doing well at the 1977 district council elections.

Although the by-election saw a significant swing from Labour to SNP, because the SNP failed to take the seat it was seen as a defeat for them.  Labour did even better, and the SNP worse, shortly after this, in the 1978 regional elections, and Westminster by-elections in Hamilton and Berwick and East Lothian.

See also
Glasgow Garscadden constituency
List of United Kingdom by-elections (1950–1979)

References

 British Parliamentary Election Results 1974-1983, compiled and edited by F.W.S. Craig (Parliamentary Research Services 1984)

By-elections to the Parliament of the United Kingdom in Glasgow constituencies
1978 in Scotland
1970s elections in Scotland
1978 elections in the United Kingdom
1970s in Glasgow
April 1978 events in the United Kingdom